Sailing competitions at the 1971 Mediterranean Games was held from 6 to 17 October 1971  in İzmir.

Medal table

Medal summary

References

External links
 Complete 1971 Mediterranean Games Standings

1971
Mediterranean Games
Sailing competitions in Turkey